Joseph Devellerez Thaung Shwe (10 October 1935 – 17 February 2015) was a Burmese Roman Catholic bishop. Born in Twante and ordained to the priesthood in 1961, Devellerez Thaung Shwe was named bishop of Roman Catholic Diocese of Pyay, Burma in 1975, retired in 2010 and died in 2015.

References 

1935 births
2015 deaths
People from Yangon Region
21st-century Roman Catholic bishops in Myanmar
20th-century Roman Catholic bishops in Myanmar
Place of death missing